Kala Dhanda Goray Log is a 1986 Hindi-language action thriller film directed by Sanjay Khan, starring Sunil Dutt, Sanjay Khan, Anita Raj, Akbar Khan and Amrita Singh. The film's music was by Louis Banks and Laxmikant–Pyarelal, while the lyrics were by Anand Bakshi. The film was shot Chandivali Studio and Film City in Mumbai. This was Khan's last film, before shifting to television, acting and directing TV series like The Sword of Tipu Sultan (1990).<ref>{{cite news |title=Sanjay Khans new film project to be announced next month|url=http://ibnlive.in.com/generalnewsfeed/news/sanjay-khans-new-film-project-to-be-announced-next-month/579571.html |archive-url=https://archive.today/20120713152115/http://ibnlive.in.com/generalnewsfeed/news/sanjay-khans-new-film-project-to-be-announced-next-month/579571.html |url-status=dead |archive-date=13 July 2012 |publisher= CNN-IBN|date=16 February 2011  }}</ref> The title of film became a popular phrase regarding corruption in high places.

 Cast 
 Sunil Dutt as Gauri Shankar / Michael
 Sanjay Khan  as Raja
 Anita Raj as Sandhya
 Akbar Khan as Ramu
 Amrita Singh as  Mrs. Ramola Gauri Shankar / Pooja
 Saeed Jaffrey as Pinto Ustad
 Sujit Kumar as Inspector Shiva Singh
 Shreeram Lagoo as Haji Irshad Patel
 Shafi Inamdar as Advocate Abdul Rahim Khan
 Bob Christo as Bob
 Mohan Agashe as Custom Officer Sudarshan Kumar (as Dr. Mohan Agase)
 Sushma Seth as Mrs. Durga Das Jetia
 Leena Das
 Anupam Kher as Durga Das Jetia
 Shammi Kapoor (Special Appearance)
 Bharat Bhushan as Maharaj
 Satyen Kappu as  I.G.P. Shukla
 Sudhir Dalvi as Police Inspector 
 Sulochana Latkar as Badi Maa
 Jeevan as Kidnapper
 Yunus Parvez as Chaman
 Ramesh Deo as Gauri Shankar's Neighbor
 Imtiaaz as Upadhyaay
 Subbiraj as Police Commissioner
 Deepika Chikhalia as Terisa (Guest Role)
 Mohan Sherry

 Soundtrack 
The music of the film was given by Louis Banks and Laxmikant–Pyarelal, while the lyrics were by Anand Bakshi. It also featured a qawwali, Allah Hoo Allah Hoo'', for which veteran actor Shammi Kapoor made a guest appearance.

References

External links 
 

1986 films
1980s Hindi-language films
1986 action thriller films
Indian action thriller films
Films scored by Laxmikant–Pyarelal
Films about corruption in India